Polygon Wave EP is the first extended play (EP) by Japanese girl group Perfume, released on September 22, 2021 by Universal Music Japan sublabel Universal J and its imprint Perfume Records.

Background and composition

Background 
A month after the title track's release, an announcement was made that there would be an EP with the same name as the lead single for physical releases. The track listing and cover were published including a teaser.

The EP was released on September 22, 2021 in two editions. The regular edition was physically released with all 7 tracks, while the limited edition featured a bonus video. The contents in the video includes a commentary about the group's previous online concert by the members and Rhizomatiks member Daito Manabe, who was responsible for the visuals of the show.

Composition 
Polygon Wave EP is an extended play consisting of seven tracks that were all written and produced by Yasutaka Nakata.

Commercial performance 
Polygon Wave EP debuted at number two of the Oricon Weekly Albums chart with 27,403 copies sold on its first week of release. This became Perfume's first album release not to top the said chart since their debut compilation album Perfume: Complete Best (#24) in the period of 2006-2007.

Track listing

Charts

References 

2021 EPs
Electropop EPs
Funk EPs
Perfume (Japanese band) albums
Universal J EPs